H. Allen Fernald (born June 1, 1932 in Haverhill, Massachusetts to Harold Allen and Leona Swan (Horton) Fernald) is an American multi-millionaire, publishing executive, and philanthropist.  He was the Chief Executive Officer of Holt, Rinehart & Winston from 1995—1999.

Education
Bachelor of Arts, University of Maine, 1954, Alpha Tau Omega
Master of Business Administration, New York University, 1964
Doctor of Philosophy, University of Maine, 2002
Doctor of Letters, University of Maine, 2002

Philanthropy

In January 2005, H. Allen Fernald and his wife, Sally Carroll Fernald, gifted 86-acres of pristine forest on the summit of Bald Mountain to the state of Maine. In 2007, H. Allen Fernald personally donated $1,000,000.00 to the University of Maine to support the arts.

Career
H. Allen Fernald began his career in Manhattan in the 1960s, "[rising quickly] through the ranks of Holt, Rinehart & Winston and later CBS, ultimately becoming their senior vice president and head of the college publishing division." From 1970-1977, Fernald was the vice president of Columbia Broadcasting Systems. From 1981-1985, he was the president of Hanson Energy Products, Inc.
From 1978 to 2003, he was a board member of United Publications, Inc. Since 2003, Fernald has served on the board of directors for John Wiley & Sons, Inc. He currently serves as Secretary of the Ocean Energy Institute of the University of Maine. Fernald was an early investor in subaquatic tidal power plants and windmill technologies in the United States of America.

Personal life

H. Allen Fernald married Sally Camilla Carroll on June 23, 1956. He has three children with Sally Carroll: Robert Arthur Fernald, Melissa Anne Fernald, and Thomas Allen Fernald. His grandchildren are Samuel Fernald, Benjamin Fernald, Lucius Fernald, Eleni Fernald, Henry Fernald, and Zachary Fernald. He has been a long-term resident of Camden, Maine since the early 1980s. His main residence sits on the summit of Bald Mountain in Camden, Maine.

References

American business executives
University of Maine alumni
New York University Stern School of Business alumni
People from Haverhill, Massachusetts
American publishing chief executives
1932 births
Living people